Seselopsis is a genus of flowering plants belonging to the family Apiaceae.

Its native range is Central Asia to Xinjiang.

Species:

Seselopsis pusilla 
Seselopsis tianschanica

References

Apioideae
Apioideae genera